Sarah Diana Stevenson, MBE (born 30 March 1983) is a British taekwondo athlete.

A world champion in 2001, Stevenson won her country's first ever Olympic medal in taekwondo, a bronze, at the 2008 Games in Beijing, her third Olympic competition for Great Britain. Controversially eliminated before the medal rounds, she was reinstated following appeal and went on to win the bronze medal final.

Stevenson again became world champion in 2011, despite the loss of both her parents to cancer in the preceding year.

Stevenson was selected for her home games in London in 2012, where she took the Olympic oath at the opening ceremony on behalf of all the athletes. Her injury-truncated build up to the Games led to an early elimination; she had taken silver at the Olympic qualifiers despite suffering a broken hand.

In 2013, Stevenson announced her retirement from competition, and her intention to take up a coaching role in the Great Britain team.

Early life
Stevenson was born in Doncaster and attended the Don Valley High School in Scawthorpe. She started training taekwondo at the age of 7.

Career
Stevenson started her career by becoming Junior World Champion in 1998. In 2000, she won the 3rd place in taekwondo at the 2000 Summer Olympics's World Qualification Tournament and qualified for the 2000 Summer Olympics in Women's 67 kg. These achievements won her fame and drew the attention of martial arts superstar Jackie Chan who sponsored her while promoting his film Shanghai Noon in the United Kingdom. But in the 2000 Olympics she lost to Norway's Trude Gundersen in the semifinal and Japan's Yoriko Okamoto in the bronze match. The next year, she became a world champion in the 2001 World Taekwondo Championships's Women's Middleweight, defeating 2000 Summer Olympics gold medalist Chen Zhong in the final. She became the first British Taekwondo World champion.

At the 2004 Olympics in the Women's +67 kg event she was eliminated by Venezuela's Adriana Carmona in the first round. She later trained at Sportcity in Manchester and is a member of the Allstars Taekwondo Academy in Doncaster. coached by Master Gary Sykes

2008 Olympics
Due to an "error" in judging, Stevenson almost exited the 2008 Olympics in the quarterfinal stage following her match with China's Chen Zhong, the gold medal favourite.  In the final round of the match, the judges failed to award Stevenson two points for a high-kick to the head, which would have put her one point in the lead with 10 seconds remaining.  Following the match, the British team representative immediately made an official protest and, after studying video footage of the kick the judges reversed the result of the fight and Stevenson progressed to the semifinal.  Stevensons's semifinal opponent was María del Rosario Espinoza of Mexico, and she lost 4–1, also sustaining a twisted ankle.  She then went on to compete for bronze in the repechage, defeating Noha Abd Rabo of Egypt and winning Britain's first Olympic medal in the sport of taekwondo.

On announcing the change of result in the quarter final, the tournament director said:

As a result of this judging error in particular, emphasis may be switching to having electronic scoring equipment contained within the actual body protectors themselves, and many tournaments are now using these in trial phase. However, since this technology is far from refined, and due to tactical differences needed in gameplay and style, Stevenson, and athletes from other National Teams, currently do not favour this system and often boycott such tournaments.

2012 Olympics
At the opening ceremony of the London 2012 Olympics, Sarah Stevenson was chosen to take the Competitors oath.  She lost to American Paige McPherson in the preliminary round.

Career highlights
2011 World Taekwondo Championships: Gold
2010 European Championships: Gold
2009 British Open International: Gold
2008 Summer Olympics: Bronze
2006 Commonwealth Taekwondo Championships: Gold 
2005 World Taekwondo Championships: Silver
2005 European Championships: Gold
2004 European Championships: Gold
2004 Summer Olympics: 15th
2001 World Taekwondo Championships: Gold
2000 Summer Olympics: 4th
1998 European Championships: Gold

Personal life
Stevenson was appointed Member of the Order of the British Empire (MBE) in the 2012 New Year Honours for services to martial arts.

In January 2014 Stevenson was made a Freeman of her home town of Doncaster.

References

External links
 Sarah Stevenson's official website
 Sarah Stevenson's profile on GB Taekwondo

1983 births
Sportspeople from Doncaster
English female taekwondo practitioners
Living people
Olympic bronze medallists for Great Britain
Olympic medalists in taekwondo
Olympic taekwondo practitioners of Great Britain
Taekwondo practitioners at the 2000 Summer Olympics
Taekwondo practitioners at the 2004 Summer Olympics
Taekwondo practitioners at the 2008 Summer Olympics
University of Massachusetts Amherst alumni
Members of the Order of the British Empire
Taekwondo practitioners at the 2012 Summer Olympics
Medalists at the 2008 Summer Olympics
Oath takers at the Olympic Games
The Sunday Times Sportswoman of the Year winners
European Taekwondo Championships medalists
World Taekwondo Championships medalists